Adenike Temidayo Oladiji (born 27 April 1968) is a Nigerian academic and the first female Vice-chancellor of the Federal University of Technology Akure. Her appointment was ratified by the governing council of the institution at its special meeting held on 13 May 2022. She succeeded professor Joseph Fuwape, whose term ended on Monday 23 May 2022. Prior to her appointment, she held various positions and served on University Committees in the University of Ilorin as Chairman and Member.

She has also served under various capacities in the University of Ilorin including Head of Department, Sub Dean of Faculty, Deputy Director Center for International Education, Director Center for Research and Development and In-House Training and Director Central Research Laboratory. She has also served as Dean School Of Basic Medical Sciences (Kwara State University), Dean School of Life Sciences and Member Governing Council, Federal Polytechnic, Nasarawa and Crown Hill University, Eiyenkorin, Ilorin.

Education 
Adenike Oladiji was born on 27 April 1968. She attended Christ Anglican School, Ijomu-Oro and Iludun Oro Nursery and Primary School between 1972 and 1977. She had her secondary education at St. Claire’s Anglican Grammar School, Offa from 1977 to 1982, all in Kwara State. She holds a B.Sc Biochemistry, Second Class Upper Division Degree from the University of Ilorin, 1988, MSc. Biochemistry, University of Ilorin, 1991 and Doctor of Philosophy Degree in Biochemistry from the University of Ilorin, 1997.

Profile 
She joined the services of the University of Ilorin in July 1992 as Assistant Lecturer and was appointed a Professor in September 2011. She has over 29 years of continuous service in the university system. She has held various positions and served on almost all University Committees as Chairman and Member. She has also served in various capacities including Head of Department; Sub Dean of Faculty; Deputy Director, Center for International Education; Director, Center for Research and Development and In-House Training; Director, Central Research Laboratory; Dean, School Of Basic Medical Sciences (Kwara State University); Dean, School of Life Sciences and Member, Governing Council, Federal Polytechnic, Nasarawa and Crown Hill University, Eiyenkorin, Ilorin.

A prolific researcher with over 100 publications, Professor Oladiji has won many distinctions and awards which include University’s Merit Award, Certificate of Merit and scholarships among others. She is a Fellow of the Nigerian Academy of Science and Fellow, Nigerian Society for Biochemistry and Molecular Biology. She has served as Member of various Scienctific Committees at the National Universities Commission, NUC, Tertiary Education Fund, TetFund and has been an external examiner in over 20  Universities in Nigeria and outside the country. She is a Member of Professional Bodies such as the West Africa Research and Innovation Management (WARIMA), American Society of Nutrition, Organization for Women in Science for Developing World (OSWD), Science Association of Nigeria and Nigerian Society for Experimental Biology. 
She is happily married and blessed with children.

Professor Oladiji succeeded Professor Joseph Fuwape, whose term ended on Monday 23 May 2022.

References

Living people
Nigerian women academics
Nigerian biochemists
Nigerian academic administrators
Nigerian academics
21st-century Nigerian women
Vice-Chancellors of Nigerian universities
Yoruba people
Yoruba women
Yoruba women academics
1968 births
University of Ilorin alumni
Academic staff of the Federal University of Technology Akure
People from Kwara State
Women heads of universities and colleges